The 1956 NCAA Cross Country Championships were contested at the 18th annual NCAA-sanctioned cross country meet to determine the team and individual national champions of men's collegiate cross country running in the United States. Held on November 26, 1956, the meet was hosted by Michigan State College at the Forest Akers East Golf Course in East Lansing, Michigan. The distance for the race was 4 miles (6.4 kilometers).

Since the current multi-division format for NCAA championship did not begin until 1973, all NCAA members were eligible. In total, 14 teams and 115 individual runners contested this championship.

The team national championship was won by the Michigan State Spartans, their fifth and second consecutive. The individual championship was won by Walter McNew, from Texas, with a time of 19:55.94.

Men's title
Distance: 4 miles (6.4 kilometers)

Team Result (Top 10)

References
 

NCAA Cross Country Championships
NCAA Men's Cross Country Championships
NCAA University Division Cross Country Championships
Sports competitions in East Lansing, Michigan
Track and field in Michigan
NCAA University Division Cross Country Championships
Michigan State University